Labeobarbus stappersii is a species of ray-finned fish in the genus Labeobarbus is found in Lake Mweru and the Luapula River in the Democratic Republic of the Congo and Zambia.

References 

stappersii
Taxa named by George Albert Boulenger
Fish described in 1915